William Charles White (August 31, 1865 – June 14, 1943) was the 5th Anglican Bishop of Newfoundland (1918–42).

White was born at Trinity Bay, Newfoundland and his father was Robert White.

White was a curate of Bonavista; rector of Fogo (1890-1900), Heart's Content (1900-1908), and the Cathedral of St. John the Baptist, St. John's (1908-1917).

White was the first native born bishop of the Diocese of Eastern Newfoundland and Labrador. He ordained "70 Queen's men during his term of office."

External links
Bishop William White

References

1865 births
1943 deaths
20th-century Anglican Church of Canada bishops
Anglican bishops of Newfoundland